Mork is a computer file format used by several email clients and web browsers produced by Netscape, and later, Mozilla Foundation. It was developed by David McCusker with the aim of creating a minimal database replacement that would be reliable, flexible, and efficient, and use a file format close to plain text.

The format was named after the character Mork from the TV show Mork & Mindy.

Usage 
The Mork format was used in most Mozilla-based projects, including the Mozilla browser suite, SeaMonkey, Firefox, and Thunderbird. In Firefox, it was used for browsing history data and form history data. In Thunderbird, it is still used for many things, such as address book data (.mab files) and the mail folder summaries (.msf files).

Criticisms 

Mork has many suboptimal properties. For example, despite the aim of efficiency, storing Unicode text takes three or six bytes per character.

The file format has been severely criticized by Jamie Zawinski, a former Netscape engineer. He has lambasted the ostensibly "textual" format on the grounds that it is "not human-readable", bemoaned the impossibility of writing a correct parser for the format, and referred to it as "...the single most braindamaged file format that I have ever seen in my nineteen year career".

In response, McCusker stated that the problems with Mork resulted from "conflicting requirements" and that he merely fixed scalability issues in bad code he "inherited".

The Register lambasted the Mork database with their article "Why has Thunderbird turned into a turkey?"

Obsolescence 

The replacement system, used for storing all user configuration data, is called MozStorage. MozStorage is based on the SQLite database. Beginning with Firefox 3.0, Firefox uses it for its history, form history and bookmark data. The storage engine was also included in Firefox 2.0, but only for use with extensions.

Mork was completely removed from Firefox in 2011.

Plans existed for Mork to be replaced with MozStorage in Thunderbird 3.0., but as of 2023 still used the Mork file format.  As of 2012, SeaMonkey used Mork for at least its POP and IMAP mail folders indexes.

Software that handles Mork files 
 The original Mozilla MorkReader (CPP)
 Mozilla-Mork (Perl)
 mork-converter (Python)

See also 
 Berkeley DB

References

External links 
 McCusker's description of the syntax
 Grammar as mentioned in the above syntax description
 Mork structure
 Mozilla Wiki Mork page (including links to tools for reading Mork documents)

Computer file formats
Mozilla